Percival Hall Dawson (born 4 December 1889 – 1974) was an English footballer who played as a centre forward. He played in the Scottish Football League for Heart of Midlothian and in the English Football League for Blackburn Rovers, moving between them in 1914 for what is believed to be a record transfer fee at the time.

Career
Dawson was born in Cullercoats. Early on in his football career, he played for non-league sides Whitley Athletic and North Shields before moving to Scottish club Heart of Midlothian in 1911. In 1913, however, Hearts were required to sell Dawson in order to fund improvements to their Tynecastle Stadium, and he was transferred to Blackburn Rovers for a fee of £2,500 – a fee which several sources claim was a then world record transfer fee.

In his first season with Blackburn, he contributed to the club winning the English First Division, and helped them to a third-place finish the following season.

The outbreak of World War I brought about an end to professional football in England for four seasons. After serving as a sergeant in the Royal Garrison Artillery during the war, Dawson returned to Blackburn and remained with the club until 1922. He played four matches for Barrow in 1923 before retiring from football.

References

External links
Spartacus Educational Profile

1889 births
English footballers
Footballers from Tyne and Wear
People from Cullercoats
Heart of Midlothian F.C. players
Scottish Football League players
English Football League players
Blackburn Rovers F.C. players
Barrow A.F.C. players
North Shields F.C. players
Scotland wartime international footballers
Association football forwards
British Army personnel of World War I
Royal Garrison Artillery soldiers
1974 deaths
Newcastle United F.C. wartime guest players
Military personnel from Northumberland